Avia D is a medium truck model line made by the Czech company Avia in Prague's Letňany. Since 2000, they have replaced the Avia A 60/65/70/75/80 series. Modifications of the series were: Avia D 60/65/75/80/85/90/100/110/120 and Avia D 120 4x4. Trucks have complied with the Euro-5 standard. The Avia D 75 (without engine and gearbox) was supplied, for example, to the British company Smith's Electric Vehicles (SEV), which built from them an all-electric trucks.

In the Czech Republic, production was terminated in 2013, then were in India produced trucks based on Avia D, named were Ashok Leyland Boss. After the Avia was bought by the Czech company CSG, its production in the Czech Republic was restored in September 2017, the facelift was named Avia D Initia and meets the Euro-6 standard.

Specifications 
 motor: Cummins ISB4.5, 4-cylinder with direct fuel injection and turbocharger
 displacement: 4.5 L
 max. power :  -  @ 2500 rpm
 max. torque :  -  @ 1700 rpm
 top speed: 118 km/h
 dimensions: 5,800 x 2,200 x 2,390-2,520 mm
 total weight: 6,000-12,000 kg
 fuel tank capacity: 120-200 l
 transmission: ZF6S850, 6-speed, fully synchronized

Facelift 
The Czech company CSG purchased the Avia brand from the Indian owners in April 2016 and decided to renew the Avia D production in the Czech Republic. The production was moved from Letňany to Přelouč. In June 2017, a new facelifted Avia D (Euro5) was introduced at the Moscow fair. Production of the new Avia D Initia was launched in September 2017. Trucks meet the Euro-6 emission standard and have Cummins ISB 4.5l four-cylinder engines (150, 180 and 210 hp). Initia presents a new vehicle mask, as well as the updated technology and equipment. The company wants to produce annually about 360-400 units.

Since 2019, the company has abandoned the lower models D75 and D90 Initia and only continues to produce D120 Initia 4x4 (134 kW or 152 kW).

References

External links
 Avia D Official site

Cars of the Czech Republic
All-wheel-drive vehicles
Trucks of the Czech Republic